Fajr Interchange is an interchange in Tehran, Iran. It is between Hemmat and Modares Expressway.

Transport in Tehran